Erbacon is a small unincorporated community and coal town in Webster County, West Virginia, United States. The town's namesake was a prominent investor, E.R. Bacon, who owned much of the land surrounding what is now Erbacon during the early 20th century.

References 

Unincorporated communities in Webster County, West Virginia
Unincorporated communities in West Virginia
Coal towns in West Virginia